Mireuksan (미륵산; 彌勒山) is the name of several mountains in South Korea:

 Mireuksan (Gangwon-do)
 Mireuksan (Jeollabuk-do)
 Mireuksan (Gyeongsangbuk-do)
 Mireuksan (Gyeongsangnam-do)